Storm over Asia (French: Tempête sur l'Asie) is a 1938 French drama film directed by Richard Oswald and starring Conrad Veidt, Sessue Hayakawa and Madeleine Robinson.

Production
Oswald had left Austria as it became an increasingly hostile working environment in the years leading up to Anchluss. It was his last film in Europe, before he moved to the United States and made three films in Hollywood. Conrad Veidt was similarly an exile from Germany, and had settled in Britain.

The film's sets were designed by the art directors Claude Bouxin and Raymond Gabutti.

Synopsis
An adventurer gets into a series of scrapes when he tries to secure control of oil deposits in Mongolia.

Reception
Reviewing the film Variety wrote that it was "a moderately good adventure drama" and predicted it would enjoy commercial success in France due to the popularity of Conrad Veidt. Going on to observe "It's almost a one-man film and Veidt makes all there is to be made out of a story that sometimes is fantastic enough to seem ludicrous".

Cast
 Conrad Veidt as Erich Keith 
 Sessue Hayakawa as Le prince Ling 
 Madeleine Robinson as Suzanne 
 Lucas Gridoux as Jack Murphy 
 Serge Grave as Jimmy 
 Paul Azaïs as Jonny le pianiste 
 Robert Le Vigan as Sir Richard 
 Raymond Aimos as Pierre, le pickpocket 
 Alexandre Mihalesco as Le fou 
 Habib Benglia as Washington-Napoléon Brown 
 Michiko Tanaka as Le princesse Shô 
 Roger Duchesne as Le Docteur Leclerc

References

Bibliography
 John T. Soister. Conrad Veidt on Screen: A Comprehensive Illustrated Filmography. McFarland, 2002.

External links

1938 films
1930s adventure drama films
French adventure drama films
1930s French-language films
Films directed by Richard Oswald
Films set in Mongolia
French black-and-white films
1938 drama films
1930s French films